Regina Pinkert (1869–1931) was a Polish opera singer and soprano.

She first came to attention in the United States when appearing at the Metropolitan Opera House for the 1906-07 season.

References

1869 births
1931 deaths
Musicians from Warsaw
19th-century Polish women opera singers
20th-century Polish women opera singers
Polish operatic sopranos